Phan Thu Ngân (born 1980 in Đồng Nai) was crowned the seventh Miss Vietnam in 2000 when she was a second year student at Văn Lang University, Ho Chi Minh City. She also received the best answer award in the competition. After the Miss Viet Nam 2000 beauty pageant, she got married and refused to compete in Miss Universe 2001.

Miss Viet Nam 2000
The winner : Phan Thu Ngân (Saigon)
 First runner up : Lê Thanh Nga (Thái Nguyên)
 Second runner up : Nguyễn Thị Ngọc Oanh (Hải Phòng)

References

External links
Miss Vietnam official website
Phan Thu Ngan

1980 births
Living people
Miss Vietnam winners
2000 in Vietnam
People from Đồng Nai Province